The 1903 Howard Bulldogs football team was an American football team that represented Howard College (now known as the Samford University) as an independent during the 1903 college football season. Under head coaches W. T. O'Hara (games 1–2) and Houston Gwin (games 3–5), the team compiled a record of 2–3.

Schedule

References

Howard
Samford Bulldogs football seasons
Howard Bulldogs football